Teath Kimheng (born 1 May 2000) is a Cambodian footballer who plays for Visakha in the Cambodian League and has represented Cambodia in multiple levels.

Club career
Teath Kimheng made his senior appearance debut for Cambodian League side Visakha in 2019.

International career
Teath Kimheng made his senior debut in friendly game against Bangladesh national football team on the 9th of March 2019.

External links
Teath Kimheng at NationalFootballTeams

Living people
Cambodia international footballers
2000 births
Visakha FC players
Cambodian Premier League players
Association football midfielders
Cambodian footballers